Héctor Gabriel Morales (born 30 November 1989, in Argentina)  is an Argentine football player who currently plays for Villa San Carlos of the Primera B Metropolitana in the Argentine football league system as an attacking midfielder.

References

External links
Profile at HLSZ

1989 births
Living people
Argentine footballers
Association football forwards
Nemzeti Bajnokság I players
Estudiantes de La Plata footballers
Ferencvárosi TC footballers
C.D. Victoria players
Argentine expatriate footballers
Expatriate footballers in Hungary
Argentine expatriate sportspeople in Hungary
Expatriate footballers in Honduras
People from Corrientes
Sportspeople from Corrientes Province